Joshua David Duhamel (born November 14, 1972) is an American actor. After various modeling work, he made his acting debut as Leo du Pres on the ABC daytime soap opera All My Children and later starred as Danny McCoy on NBC's Las Vegas.

Duhamel has ventured into film, appearing as one of the main protagonists in four of the Transformers films, most recently in the fifth entry, Transformers: The Last Knight (2017). He has also appeared in When in Rome (2010), Life as We Know It (2010), New Year's Eve (2011), Safe Haven (2013), and You're Not You (2014). In 2015, Duhamel co-starred on the short-lived CBS crime drama Battle Creek. He has also starred in several video games, most notably Call of Duty: WWII (2017). In 2018, he appeared in the coming of age film Love, Simon.  In 2021, Duhamel starred in the role of Sheldon Sampson in the Netflix superhero series Jupiter's Legacy. He also played the role of Jacob Lee in the 2022 survival horror game The Callisto Protocol.

Early life
Duhamel was born in Minot, North Dakota. His mother, Bonnie L. (Bachmeier) Kemper, is a retired teacher and local businesswoman, and his father, Larry Duhamel, is an advertising salesman. He is of French-Canadian, Irish, English, Austrian, German and Norwegian ancestry. Duhamel's family is Catholic.

His parents divorced during his youth. Although he remains close to both of them, he grew up with his mother and his three younger sisters, Ashlee, Kassidy and Mckenzee Duhamel. After graduating from Minot High School in 1991, Duhamel attended Minot State University and played as the backup quarterback for the university's football team. He planned to attend dental school, but dropped out one-and-a-half credits shy of his undergraduate degree. He later completed his credits, and received his degree in 2005.

Career
Duhamel has stated, "After college, I followed an ex-girlfriend to northern California, did a bunch of odd jobs." He won the title of Male Model of the Year in an International Modeling and Talent Association (IMTA) competition in 1997 (the runner-up was actor Ashton Kutcher).

Duhamel began his acting career as an extra in the music videos for Donna Summer's "I Will Go With You (Con te partirò)" and Christina Aguilera's "Genie in a Bottle" in 1999. Josh trained with Scott Sedita Acting Studios. Later that year, he won the role of Leo du Pres on the ABC soap opera All My Children. His work on the show, especially his character's pairing with Greenlee Smythe (portrayed by actress Rebecca Budig), garnered critical acclaim. In 2000, he posed fully nude for Greg Gorman's As I See It photography book.

In 2003, he received a Daytime Emmy Award nomination for the Special Fan Award for America's Favorite Couple in 2002, shared with Budig, and a Daytime Emmy Award for Outstanding Supporting Actor for his portrayal of Leo du Pres. Duhamel left All My Children in 2002 to pursue other acting opportunities. In 2003, Duhamel landed a primetime role on the NBC show Las Vegas, playing the head of security for the Montecito Casino, Danny McCoy. His character succeeded James Caan's as head of the casino after Caan departed the series at the end of the fourth season. The series ended in 2008.

Duhamel made his big-screen acting debut in 2004's Win a Date with Tad Hamilton!, then starred in the thriller Turistas (2006). After watching an episode of Las Vegas in which Duhamel's character had just returned from the war in Iraq, Steven Spielberg handpicked him for the role of Captain William Lennox in 2007's summer blockbuster film Transformers (a film for which Spielberg was the executive producer). Duhamel reprised the role in three of the sequels: Transformers: Revenge of the Fallen, released in June 2009, Transformers: Dark of the Moon, released in June 2011, and Transformers: The Last Knight, released in June 2017.

Duhamel was the official pace car driver for the 2009 Indianapolis 500, driving the 2010 Chevrolet Camaro pace car. In 2010, he played the lead role in the film When in Rome as Nick Beamon. In 2014 Duhamel starred in the touching drama You're Not You (2014) playing the husband of Kate (Hilary Swank), who has the degenerative disease ALS.

On March 23, 2013, Duhamel hosted the 2013 Kids' Choice Awards, which was broadcast live from Los Angeles, California. He and his co-star from Safe Haven, Julianne Hough, performed a Safe Haven-themed showcase appearance via video on The Price is Right with Drew Carey.

In 2016, he starred as Frank Dunning in the Hulu science fiction thriller miniseries 11.22.63.

In 2018, he was used on a Taco Bell commercial to advertise Mexican spiced fries with nacho cheese sauce called Web of Fries.

In March 2018, it was announced that Duhamel will be starring alongside Megan Fox, in the independent family comedy Think Like a Dog. In the same year, he starred in the romantic comedy-drama film, Love, Simon.

On February 11, 2019, it was announced that Duhamel had been cast as Sheldon Sampson in the Netflix superhero series, Jupiter's Legacy. The series premiered on May 7, 2021, and was canceled less than a month later.

In February 2021, it was announced that Duhamel would co-star opposite Jennifer Lopez in the upcoming film Shotgun Wedding, replacing Armie Hammer, who had left the project in January, following controversy concerning sexually explicit social media activity. In August 2021, it was announced that Duhamel joined Renée Zellweger in The Thing About Pam limited series on NBC. He was to play a defense attorney, Joel Schwartz, on this show based on a real-life crime story.

In early 2022, it was announced that Duhamel had been cast as a series regular on The Mighty Ducks: Game Changers, for its second season, as Gavin Cole, a former NHL player-turned-coach who runs the hockey institute.

On September 23, 2022, Duhamel's film Bandit, based on the best-selling novel and true story about The Flying Bandit, was released in theatres and on demand. The film received positive reviews with critics calling it a career-best performance for Duhamel.

Personal life
Duhamel met and began dating singer Stacy Ann Ferguson, better known by her stage name Fergie, in September 2004 after Ferguson appeared on Duhamel's show Las Vegas with her then-band The Black Eyed Peas. The couple wed on January 10, 2009, in a Catholic ceremony at the Church Estate Vineyards in Malibu, California. They have a son born in August 2013. On September 14, 2017, the couple announced that they had separated earlier in the year. On June 1, 2019, the couple filed for divorce after two years of separation. As of late-November 2019, their divorce was finalized.

Duhamel is a practicing Catholic and attends church regularly.

In 2005, he became the co-owner of 10 North Main, a restaurant in Minot, North Dakota.

In 2012, Duhamel was inducted into the Scandinavian-American Hall of Fame, a signature event of Norsk Høstfest.

He dated Mexican actress Eiza González in 2018.

In late 2018, Duhamel began dating former Miss World America Audra Mari. On January 8, 2022, Duhamel announced his engagement to Mari. They married on September 10, 2022.

On May 19, 2022, Minot State University named their Summer Theatre stage the "Josh Duhamel Stage" in his honor.

Duhamel is a longtime fan of the Minnesota Vikings.

Filmography

Film

Television

Video games

References

External links

 
 
 
 
 
 
 10 North Main, Duhamel's restaurant

Fergie (singer)
1972 births
Living people
Male actors from North Dakota
People from Minot, North Dakota
People from Ward County, North Dakota
Minot State University alumni
American people of French-Canadian descent
Male models from North Dakota
20th-century American male actors
21st-century American male actors
American male film actors
American male soap opera actors
American male television actors
American male voice actors
Daytime Emmy Award winners
Daytime Emmy Award for Outstanding Supporting Actor in a Drama Series winners
American people of English descent
American people of German descent
American people of Irish descent
American people of Norwegian descent
American restaurateurs
American Roman Catholics
Minot State Beavers football players
People from Brentwood, Los Angeles
20th-century Roman Catholics
21st-century Roman Catholics
Catholics from North Dakota